How the Grinch Stole Christmas! is a 1957 book by Dr. Seuss. 

How the Grinch Stole Christmas may also refer to:
 How the Grinch Stole Christmas! (TV special), a 1966 animated special
 How the Grinch Stole Christmas (2000 film), a film starring Jim Carrey
 Dr. Seuss' How the Grinch Stole Christmas! The Musical
 Dr. Seuss: How the Grinch Stole Christmas!, 2007 Nintendo DS video game adaptation

See also
 The Grinch (film), an animated film adaptation of the book starring Benedict Cumberbatch